Julian Venonsky (born October 15, 1993) is an American rower. He competed in the men's eight event at the 2020 Summer Olympics. He is openly gay.

References

External links
 California Golden Bears bio
 

1993 births
Living people
American male rowers
Olympic rowers of the United States
Rowers at the 2020 Summer Olympics
Place of birth missing (living people)
California Golden Bears rowers
American LGBT sportspeople